These are the late night Monday-Friday schedules on all four networks for each calendar season beginning September 1954. All times are Eastern and Pacific.

Two of the four networks began late-night schedules in 1954; DuMont aired its first and only show, The Ernie Kovacs Show, beginning in summer 1954, while NBC resumed late-night programming with Tonight, three years after it had canceled Broadway Open House. DuMont ceased programming the late-night time slot in spring 1955 ahead of its shutdown (Kovacs would then move to NBC), while NBC has run Tonight (now The Tonight Show) continuously since then.

Talk shows are highlighted in yellow, local programming is white.

Schedule 

United States late night network television schedules
1954 in American television
1955 in American television